Gilbertville is a city in Black Hawk County, Iowa, United States. The population was 794 at the time of the 2020 census. It is part of the Waterloo–Cedar Falls Metropolitan Statistical Area.

History
Gilbertville was platted in 1856.

Geography
Gilbertville is located at  (42.417252, -92.213964).

Tornado activity

Gilbertville-area historical tornado activity is above Iowa state average. It is 206% greater than the overall U.S. average.

On May 15, 1968, an F5 (max. wind speeds 261-318 mph) tornado 22.7 miles away from the Gilbertville city center killed 5 people and injured 156 people and caused between $5,000,000 and $50,000,000 in damages.

On August 26, 1965, an F4 (max. wind speeds 207-260 mph) tornado 8.1 miles away from the city center killed one person and injured 17 people and caused between $500,000 and $5,000,000 in damages.

Education
Gilbertville is within the Waterloo Community School District.

Private high school
Don Bosco High School 

Private elementary/middle school
Immaculate Conception-St. Joseph School

Demographics

2010 census
As of the census of 2010, there were 712 people, 303 households, and 199 families living in the city. The racial makeup of the city was 98.6% White, 0.1% Native American, 0.6% Asian, 0.1% from other races, and 0.6% from two or more races. Hispanic or Latino of any race were 1.7% of the population.

There were 303 households, of which 28.4% had children under the age of 18 living with them, 52.8% were married couples living together, 8.6% had a female householder with no husband present, 4.3% had a male householder with no wife present, and 34.3% were non-families. 28.7% of all households were made up of individuals, and 18.2% had someone living alone who was 65 years of age or older. The average household size was 2.35 and the average family size was 2.87.

The median age in the city was 42.7 years. 21.6% of residents were under the age of 18; 9.1% were between the ages of 18 and 24; 23% were from 25 to 44; 26.6% were from 45 to 64; and 19.8% were 65 years of age or older. The gender makeup of the city was 49.4% male and 50.6% female.

2000 census
As of the census of 2000, there were 767 people, 297 households, and 212 families living in the city. The racial makeup of the city was 99.48% White, 0.13% African American, and 0.39% from two or more races. Hispanic or Latino of any race were 0.78% of the population.

There were 297 households, out of which 35.0% had children under the age of 18 living with them, 61.3% were married couples living together, 7.7% had a female householder with no husband present, and 28.6% were non-families. 25.9% of all households were made up of individuals, and 16.2% had someone living alone who was 65 years of age or older. The average household size was 2.58 and the average family size was 3.14.

In the city, the population was spread out, with 27.1% under the age of 18, 8.3% from 18 to 24, 28.4% from 25 to 44, 19.6% from 45 to 64, and 16.6% who were 65 years of age or older. The median age was 38 years. For every 100 females, there were 97.2 males. For every 100 females age 18 and over, there were 98.2 males.

The median income for a household in the city was $41,490, and the median income for a family was $47,917. Males had a median income of $31,458 versus $24,286 for females. The per capita income for the city was $18,367. About 4.0% of families and 4.0% of the population were below the poverty line, including 5.9% of those under age 18 and 7.6% of those age 65 or over.

In popular culture
Irish-English singer-songwriter, Gilbert O'Sullivan named his 2011 album Gilbertville after Gilbertville. The album cover features Exit 66 on Highway 380, which is the halfway point between Raymond (his real name) and Gilbertville.

References

External links 
 City Data Comprehensive Statistical Data and more about Gilbertville, Iowa

Cities in Black Hawk County, Iowa
Cities in Iowa
Waterloo – Cedar Falls metropolitan area
1856 establishments in Iowa
Populated places established in 1856